Haliburton   is a community in the Canadian province of Nova Scotia, located in Pictou County. The community is named after Thomas Chandler Haliburton.

References

Haliburton on Destination Nova Scotia

Communities in Pictou County
General Service Areas in Nova Scotia